Nothoadmete is a genus of sea snails, marine gastropod mollusks in the family Cancellariidae, the nutmeg snails.

Species
Species within the genus Nothoadmete include:

 Nothoadmete antarctica (Strebel, 1908) 
 Nothoadmete consobrina (Powell, 1951)
 Nothoadmete delicatula (E.A. Smith, 1907)
 Nothoadmete euthymei (Barnard, 1960)
 Nothoadmete harpovoluta (Powell, 1957)
 Nothoadmete tumida Oliver, 1982

References

External links
 Hemmen J. (2007) Recent Cancellariidae. Annotated and illustrated catalogue of Recent Cancellariidae. Privately published, Wiesbaden. 428 pp. [With amendments and corrections taken from Petit R.E. (2012) A critique of, and errata for, Recent Cancellariidae by Jens Hemmen, 2007. Conchologia Ingrata 9: 1-8

Cancellariidae